The Polish census of 1931 or Second General Census in Poland was the second census taken in sovereign Poland during the interwar period, performed on December 9, 1931 by the Main Bureau of Statistics. It established that Poland's population amounted to 32 million people (over 5 million more than in the previous census of 1921).

The census was organised following the rules established by an act of the Polish Parliament of October 14, 1931. In contrast to earlier census of 1921, the 1931 census did not count national minorities and detailed information on types of farms, leaving only the question of the overall area of land owned by the citizen. The part related to education was expanded to include questions of ability to read and write.

The results of the census were being published in 39 volumes between 1936 and 1939 in a publishing series "Statistics of Poland". A list of all settlements in Poland was also prepared, but only a part related to Wilno Voivodeship was published.

Population by mother tongue and faith 
The population was categorized by mother tongue i.e. the primary language in the following categories: Polish, Ukrainian, Ruthenian (i.e. Rusyn), Belarusian, Russian, Lithuanian, German, Yiddish, Hebrew, Local, Other, and Not Declared. The category "Local" versus "Other" was hotly debated after the fact, because a number of significant languages were not on the list, e.g., Romani, Armenian, and/or what might constitute transitional language e.g. Polesian, Kashubian and others. 

The number of Polish native speakers relative to the total number of Roman Catholics may be overestimated, and possibly closer 17-18 millions.

The population was also categorized by religion. Most Jews spoke Yiddish, and many spoke Polish and Russian. These were categorized as two groups. Statistical differences existed between Ruthenians and Ukrainians. Ruthenians nationwide were 96.5% Greek Catholic but only 3.2% Orthodox, compared to Ukrainians who were almost equally divided at 52.4% Greek Catholic and 46.6% Orthodox. Most Ruthenians lived in provinces where the majority of the Ukrainian population was Greek Catholic, too.

By cities

By voivodships

Mother tongue controversy 

The census used the concept of mother tongue and religion to classify the respondents, rather than nationality. The 1921 census had included a nationality question which was replaced in the 1931 census by the "mother tongue" question; this change was protested by Ukrainians and Jews among others, many of whom were bilingual or trilingual. Moreover, many Jews by religion - almost 12% - considered Polish to be their mother tongue in 1931. However, a higher percent of Jews by religion - over 25% - considered themselves to be ethnically (or in terms of national identity) Poles, according to the previous census of 1921. Thus the number of Jews by religion increased as a percentage of the population in the 1931 survey, relative to the numbers of Jews as an ethnicity in the 1921 Census.

This situation created a difficulty in establishing the true number of ethnic non-Polish citizens of Poland. Some authors used the language criterion to attempt to establish the actual number of minorities, which was difficult considering that over 707,000 people in Polesia declared that they spoke "local" rather than any other language. Other authors used approximation based on both language and declared religion. After World War II in Soviet bloc countries the interpretation of the census was used for political purposes, to underline the officially-supported thesis that pre-war Poland incorporated areas where the non-Polish population made up the majority of inhabitants. For this purpose some authors combined all non-Polish speakers in South-Eastern Poland (namely Ukrainians, Belarusians, Rusyns, Hutsuls, Lemkos, Boykos and Poleszuks) into one category of "Ruthenians"). In fact, the census had counted speakers of Belarusian, Ukrainian, Russian, and Ruthenian languages as separate categories

Some authors contend that the change in questions asked by the census officials was due to the Polish government's wish to minimise the presence of minorities and represented an attempt to maximize the effects of a decade of educational policies stressing the Polish language. Tadeusz Piotrowski called the 1931 census official but "unreliable" for determining ethnicity, saying that by using language as an indicator of ethnicity it had underestimated the number of ethnic non-Poles, and that in particular, ethnic Poles were not a majority in the
Nowogródek Voivodeship and Polesie Voivodeship.  A 1954 study of the Polish population by the United States Census Bureau concluded that "in presenting the results, the Central Statistical office emphasized the central role played by the Polish ethnic group by increasing the number of minority groups, and thus reducing the size of a given group, shown in the results, Ukrainian and Ruthenian were tabulated as separate languages, although Ukrainian was simply the newer name for Ruthenian, used by the more politically conscious and nationalistic elements. In the Province of Polesie, the census authorities returned most of the Belorussians there as speaking 'local languages'."

After World War II the pre-war chairman of the Polish census statistical office Edward Szturm de Sztrem was quoted by communist sources to have admitted that the returned census forms had been interfered with by the executive. This it was claimed, affected particularly those forms from the south-eastern provinces. The extent of the tampering is not known.  Another English language account stated that he admitted "that officials had been directed to undercount minorities, especially those in the eastern provinces".

References

External links

Original report from census. Document is in Polish and French. Internet Archive (PDF file direct download, 88 pages). 
The  Podlaska Digital Library: document search. Partial results can be found when searching for the following keyword: Spis powszechny 1931 r

1931
1931 in Poland
Poland